Stig Krohn Haaland (born 23 February 1975) is a retired Norwegian football defender and later manager.

Hailing from Haugesund, he started his youth career in Vard and joined Haugar as a junior player. In late 1993, Haugar merged to form FK Haugesund, where Haaland played for the senior team from 1994. He was known for a precise left foot. In May 1995 he was loaned out to Nord, later making a permanent move. In the autumn of 1996 he moved to Århus to study, and played for the B team of Aarhus Fremad, but was promoted to the first team and made his debut in the Danish Superliga. He soon became regular on left back.

In 1999 Aarhus Fremad were relegated, and the club faced severe financial problems. According to reports, the wages of February 2000 were delayed. For the 2000–01 season, Haaland went into his last contract year. In October 2000, he was struck by manager Frank Pingel during practice. The news went around Denmark and Norway, and Pingel's manager spell was terminated. Haaland also desired to leave the club in the winter. He went on trial at Hamkam and was subsequently signed.

Playing one and a half season for Hamkam, he was loaned by SK Brann in August 2002. Brann did not opt to buy the player, and Haaland missed the entire 2003 season due to injury. He was released and joined Sandefjord on a one-year contract. After seeing the contract through, he had several offers from Norway and went on trial with Randers and Silkeborg before signing for FK Haugesund.
 His next venture in 2006 was two years in Icelandic Breiðablik.

From 2008 he worked in the Norwegian lower divisions, managing Nord while later playing for Vard. He left Nord in June 2010, when he was also caretaker manager of Avaldsnes. In 2011 he played 4. divisjon for Vedavåg, before moving to Denmark where he was hired as coach for Aarhus Gymnastikforening's U17 team. Over the years, Haaland also facilitated several transfers between Norway and Denmark and Iceland, such as Sanel Kapidžić's move from Denmark to Haugesund and Alexander Søderlund's move to Iceland.

References

1975 births
Living people
People from Haugesund
Norwegian footballers
SK Haugar players
FK Haugesund players
Aarhus Fremad players
Hamarkameratene players
SK Brann players
Sandefjord Fotball players
Breiðablik UBK players
Danish Superliga players
Danish 1st Division players
Norwegian First Division players
Eliteserien players
Association football defenders
Norwegian expatriate footballers
Expatriate men's footballers in Denmark
Norwegian expatriate sportspeople in Denmark
Expatriate footballers in Iceland
Norwegian expatriate sportspeople in Iceland
Norwegian football managers
Sportspeople from Rogaland